Fred McKean (born 1913), nicknamed Snowy, was an Australian rugby league footballer who played in the 1930s and 1940s.  He played for Western Suburbs and Parramatta as a prop.  He was a foundation player for Parramatta and played in their first ever match.

Playing career
McKean began his first grade career with Western Suburbs in 1939 and played six seasons with the club.  His time with Western Suburbs was not very successful and the club finished last on 3 occasions.  In 1947, McKean joined Parramatta who had just been admitted into the competition along with Manly.  Before the season began, McKean was the clubs oldest recruit at 34 years old.  McKean played for Parramatta in the club's first game against Newtown which was played at Cumberland Oval and ended in a 34–12 defeat.  McKean scored the club's second ever try after George Cook had scored the club's first.

Parramatta went on to claim the wooden spoon in their inaugural year after struggling all season with a limited roster and managed just 3 wins.  McKean played one further season for Parramatta and retired at the end of 1948.

Personal life
McKean was the father to Fred, Janice and Roy.

References

1913 births
Possibly living people
Australian rugby league players
Parramatta Eels players
Rugby league players from Warren, New South Wales
Rugby league props
Western Suburbs Magpies players